Ari Aster (born July 15, 1986) is an American film director, screenwriter, and producer. He is known for writing and directing the horror films Hereditary (2018) and Midsommar (2019). His upcoming third film, Beau Is Afraid, is slated to be released in 2023.

Early life
Aster was born into a Jewish family in New York City on July 15, 1986, the son of a musician father and a poet mother. He has a younger brother. He recalled going to see his first movie, Dick Tracy, when he was four years old. The film featured a scene where a character fired a tommy gun in front of a wall of fire. Aster reportedly jumped from his seat and "ran six New York City blocks" while his mother tried to catch him. In his early childhood, Aster's family briefly lived in England, where his father opened a jazz nightclub in Chester. Aster enjoyed living there, but the family returned to the U.S. and settled in New Mexico when he was 10 years old.

As a child, Aster became obsessed with horror films, frequently renting them from local video stores: "I just exhausted the horror section of every video store I could find. I didn't know how to assemble people who would cooperate on something like that. I found myself just writing screenplays." In 2004, he enrolled at the College of Santa Fe, where he studied film. After graduating in 2008, he was accepted into the 2010 class of fellows at the AFI Conservatory graduate program, where he earned an MFA with a focus in directing.

Career

Early short films 
Aster's debut film was the short film Tale of Two Tims, which he wrote at College of Santa Fe and submitted to American Film Institute. This garnered him a fellowship into the graduate directing program at the AFI Conservatory. Aster followed up with several AFI cycle films, along with comedic shorts made with industry friends like TDF Really Works in 2011. Aster then followed up with a breakout short film The Strange Thing About the Johnsons, which stars Billy Mayo, Brandon Greenhouse, and Angela Bullock as members of a suburban family in which the son is involved in an abusive incestuous relationship with his father.

The Strange Thing About the Johnsons was Aster's thesis film while studying at the American Film Institute's graduate school in California, and later screened at film festivals in 2011, premiering at the Slamdance Film Festival in Utah on January 22, before it leaked online in November and went viral. Ivan Kander of the website Short of the Week wrote that the comments on YouTube had "everything from effusive acclaim to disgusted vitriol. In terms of the internet, that means it's a hit." He worked on the production with fellow students from the school. The story was first conceived while discussing taboos with his friends, including Greenhouse, before Aster's first year at AFI.

Between 2011 and 2018, Aster wrote and directed five more short films, often teaming with his AFI Conservatory friends Alejandro de Leon and Pawel Pogorzelski among others.

Breakthrough with A24 
Aster made his feature film directorial debut with the horror-drama film Hereditary, which premiered on January 21, 2018, in the Midnight section at the 2018 Sundance Film Festival, and was theatrically released in the United States on June 8, 2018. It stars Toni Collette, Alex Wolff, Milly Shapiro and Gabriel Byrne as a family haunted by a mysterious presence after the death of their secretive grandmother.

Hereditary was acclaimed by critics, with Collette's performance receiving particular praise, and was a commercial success, making over $80 million on a $10 million budget to become A24's highest-grossing film worldwide. Writing for Rolling Stone, Peter Travers called it the scariest film of 2018.

Aster's next production, also with A24, was the folk horror film Midsommar, starring Florence Pugh. It follows a group of friends who travel to Sweden for a festival that occurs once every 90 years and find themselves in the clutches of a pagan cult. Midsommar was theatrically released in the United States on July 3, 2019, by A24 and in Sweden on July 10, 2019, by Nordisk Film. The film received positive reviews from critics, with many praising Aster's direction and Pugh's performance. Aster's original 171-minute cut of the film, which A24 asked Aster to trim down for a wide theatrical release, had its world premiere at the Film Society of Lincoln Center in New York City as part of its Scary Movies XII lineup on August 20, 2019. For his work on the film, Aster received a nomination for Best Screenplay at the 29th Gotham Independent Film Awards.

Ari Aster and producer Lars Knudsen announced in June 2019 the launch of their new production company, Square Peg.

In June 2020, Aster said his next film would be a four-hour long "nightmare comedy". In February 2021, A24 announced Beau Is Afraid as its third partnership with Aster. The film stars Joaquin Phoenix.

In 2021, he signed a first-look TV deal with the studio A24. In August 2022, it was announced that Aster would reteam with A24 to produce Kristoffer Borgli's second feature film Dream Scenario, with Nicolas Cage attached to star.

Filmography

Feature films

Short films

As writer/producer

References

Further reading

External links 

1986 births
21st-century American male writers
AFI Conservatory alumni
Filmmakers from New York (state)
Horror film directors
Jewish American screenwriters
Living people
Santa Fe University of Art and Design alumni
Screenwriters from New Mexico
Screenwriters from New York (state)
Writers from New Mexico
Writers from New York City
21st-century American screenwriters
21st-century American Jews